Pakistan participated at the 1990 Commonwealth Games in Auckland, New Zealand after a hiatus of 20 years. It failed to win any medal at these games. The only time it has returned empty handed from the Commonwealth Games.

References

Pakistan at the Commonwealth Games
Nations at the 1990 Commonwealth Games